Balseiro Institute is an academic institution that belongs partially to the National University of Cuyo and partially to Argentina's National Atomic Energy Commission. It is located in Bariloche, Río Negro province, Argentina. Notable alumni of this institute include Marcela Carena, Juan Maldacena, Juan Ignacio Galvan and Jorge Pullin.

Overview

The Balseiro Institute teaches Physics, Nuclear Engineering, Mechanical Engineering and Telecommunications Engineering at undergraduate and graduate levels. The institute admits students who have completed two years of university studies (either in Physics or Engineering) and undergoes a rigorous admission procedure.

It's considered the best Experimental Physics and Nuclear Engineering study centre of Latin America, as well as a very prestigious one worldwide.
This is a free public institution with a number of features that make it unique. It was created in 1955 and it was formalized in the agreement signed between the National Atomic Energy Commission (CNEA) and the National University of Cuyo (UNCuyo). Its objectives are reflected in the Resolution of the Rectorate 0445 of 1999, where both parties reiterate their willingness to jointly formulate the academic policy of the Balseiro Institute, joining forces in order to contribute jointly to the training of specialists in Sciences and Engineering and renew their objective to contribute to the research and development of activities that meet the interests of the country, through UNIVERSITY and CNEA. At the same time, the Balseiro Institute is an academic unit integrated to the Centro Atómico Bariloche (CAB), which has state-of-the-art research and development laboratories to which IB students have access to practice.
It is noteworthy that all IB students receive full scholarships, allowing them a full dedication to the study. This, among other distinctive aspects, allows students of IB degree, master and postgraduate degrees to gain advanced training in both theoretical aspects as well as laboratory practice and technological innovation.

The students of the Balseiro Institute receive personalized education given the relationship, in quantity and quality, teacher-student. At the same time, these teachers are active researchers and technologists who are continuously linked both to scientific and technological centers and to technology companies in the country and the world. In this way, the acquired experience is transmitted to the students who are formed in a stimulating field of scientific research and technological development of vanguard; Face the challenge of growing professionally in a critical attitude and able to solve novel and highly complex problems. On the other hand, and following the original premise of José Antonio Balseiro, students practice in the first level laboratories of the CAB as an indissoluble part of their respective curricula. The training is completed with various optional subjects and special courses.

Thus, at the high academic level, there is the benefit of having a scholarship, which allows students to develop their career in a full way, with an innovative, inquisitive look and with a view to the challenges in science and technology that the present poses.
At the Balseiro Institute, degrees are given in Physics, Nuclear Engineering, Mechanical Engineering and Telecommunications Engineering. The IB is the only institution in the country where Nuclear Engineering is taught at the undergraduate level. Also, they offer masters in Physics, Medical Physics and Engineering and PhDs in Physics, Nuclear Engineering and Engineering Sciences.

Other academic activities include the Specialization Course in Technological Applications of Nuclear Energy (CEATEN), as well as the IB-CAB Solid Physics School, Summer Internships, Internship Internships with National and Foreign Universities and Summer Scholarships, Specialization, Workshops, Congresses, Conferences, Colloquia and Workshops.

Since the creation of the Balseiro Institute to date (April 2013) 963 graduates and engineers, 234 masters, 460 doctorates and 112 specialists graduated from CEATEN (Specialization in Technological Applications of Nuclear Energy) graduated. Most of these professionals achieved a successful job placement.

The Balseiro Institute works on a permanent basis with the mission of making a substantial contribution to the country's growth in science and technology through the training of scientists and technologists in both the nuclear area for peaceful and non-nuclear purposes. These achievements are achieved through the promotion and realization of high-level academic activities

History 
Nuclear research in the province of Rio Negro began as the Huemul Project in the Perón era. Nuclear facilities were organized as the Bariloche Atomic Centre, under the direction of José Antonio Balseiro.

An educational institution was established as the Instituto de Física de Bariloche on April 22, 1955, as a joint project of the National Atomic Energy Commission and the National University of Cuyo; the former administers the Bariloche Atomic Centre, whose work led to the first research reactor in Latin America (1957), as well as the region's first commercial reactor, Atucha I, in 1974. The institute was renamed in 1962 to honor José Antonio Balseiro, who was its first director.

The first graduates were members of the Physics class of 1958. In the 1970s, Balseiro became the only institute in Argentina to grant degrees in nuclear engineering, as the country was stepping up its nuclear program with the incorporation of the Embalse and Atucha II, as well as continued research activity in the Constituyentes and Bariloche reactors.

See also
Sabato Institute of Technology
INVAP
Gregorio Baro
Guido Beck
Think tank#Argentina
List of Guggenheim Fellowships awarded in 2001
List of Guggenheim Fellowships awarded in 2007

References

External links
 Official website
 / Official website
Science and Education in Argentina
Argentine Higher Education Official Site

Physics institutes
Research institutes in Argentina
Educational institutions established in 1955
Nuclear technology in Argentina
1955 establishments in Argentina